Mubarak Mustafa Fazli Noorallah (born 30 March 1973) is a Qatari former footballer who works as a sports analyst for Al Kass. He is known for his numerous achievements with Qatari club Al-Arabi, as well as being the former captain of the Qatar national team.

He is one of the most prominent figures in the history of Qatari football and was an integral component of one of Qatar's best-ever national sides in the early 1990s alongside Khalid Salman, Mahmoud Soufi and Adel Khamis. According to RSSSF, he is the top scorer for Qatar with 41 goals.

Personal life
Mustafa was born in Umm Ghuwailina, a suburb of Doha located near Al Arabi's club headquarters.

Club career

Al-Arabi
Mustafa was spotted by a talent scout while playing in a domestic school league at an early age. He accepted an offer to play in Al-Arabi's junior teams where he instantly stood out among his peers.

Capitalizing on this shortly after, Al-Arabi placed Mubarak Mustafa in the successful senior squad, although it was initially difficult to get a starting position in the squad. He eventually earned a permanent place in the squad after showcasing his goal-scoring ability, securing Al-Arabi's place as Qatar's best club side at the time. He reached the peak of his career in 1994, when he led the dream team into the finals of the 1994 AFC Champions League, eventually losing to Thai Farmers Bank with a score of 1–0. In the process of Al-Arabi's Champions League campaign, they became the second Qatari team to make it to the finals of the AFC Champions League, the other club being Al Sadd.

Mustafa is also the only player in history to win the Arab Golden Boot and Arab Player of the Year award in a single season. He was also the top scorer in the Qatar Stars League three times: the first being in the 1991–1992 season, the second in the 1992–1993 season, and the final time being in the 1996–1997 season.

His exploits earning him recognition internationally; he represented the Asian XI in a match in 1999 against the Thailand national team. Asian XI lost 4–1, with Mustafa netting the team's only goal from a spot kick in the 75th minute.

During his playing period, he had many offers to play abroad, notably offers in Turkey, Kuwait, Saudi Arabia, United Arab Emirates, and a number of clubs in Bahrain. He could not pursue any of them as his club, Al Arabi, refused to let him play professionally.

Al-Khor
In a move which shocked many fans, Mustafa left Al-Arabi in 2003 to join Al Khor after a string of disappointing seasons for Al-Arabi, due to personal disputes with certain officials and players in the club. Mustafa led Al-Khor to their first major trophy in 46 years in just two seasons after Al-Khor beat Al Gharafa in 2005 to claim the Qatar Crown Prince Cup for the first time in the club's history.

Al-Gharafa
In 2006, Mustafa moved to Al-Gharafa, one of the most successful teams in the Qatar Stars League. He helped them finish second in the league, as well as making it to the finals of the Qatar Crown Prince Cup. He retired from professional football in 2007, at the age of 34.

International career
Mustafa started his senior international career at the age of 19. He helped establish the Qatar football team on the international stage, claiming many achievements in his time of playing for the Qatar national team, such as winning the 1992 Gulf Cup of Nations, reaching the quarter-finals of the 1992 Olympic Games in Barcelona, and winning the 1998 Arab Nations Cup. He played for Qatar in the 1998 World Cup Qualifiers, scoring two goals in the group stage and securing the top position in their group before getting eliminated in the final round.

In a match at the 1992 Olympic Games in Barcelona, Mustafa scored the only goal in a 1–0 win against Egypt, registering the first competitive win in Qatar's history against an African nation.

Mustafa had a reputation of being a fair player, having been shown no red cards in his international career. He later received the World Fair Play Trophy in 2005. Mustafa officially retired from international football in 2004.

After football

After retiring from professional football, Mustafa was appointed the Director of football of Al-Arabi. He still occasionally manages the first team.

In 2009, Mubarak Mustafa received the International Olympic Committee's annual ideal player award. In doing so, he is the first Qatari to ever win the award. He expressed his deep happiness for receiving IOC Award, which represents a great honor for Qatar sport in general and Qatar Olympic committee (QOC) in particular.

On 17 October 2011, Mustafa played a tribute game in honour of deceased Emirati player Theyab Awana. The game was between Al-Salmiya Stars and Arab Stars, with Mustafa playing for the former. Adel Khamis also took part in the match. The match took place in Thamir Stadium. Mustafa scored 2 early goals to give him a brace, however the visitors equalized in the second half and eventually narrowly won 7–6.

On 28 April 2012, after a very unsuccessful season for Al Arabi which saw them finish on par with their joint lowest standing in the league, he announced that he would be leaving the club as director of football at the end of the 2011/12 season. Shortly after, he joined Al Kass as a sports analyst.

Career statistics

International

Scores and results list Qatar's goal tally first, score column indicates score after each Qatar goal.

Honours
Al Arabi
 Qatar Stars League: 1991, 1993, 1994, 1996, 1997
AFC Champions League Runner up: 1994
Sheikh Jassem Cup: 1995
Qatar Crown Prince Cup: 1997
Emir of Qatar Cup: 1993

Al Khor
Qatar Crown Prince Cup: 2005

Individual
Qatar Stars League Top Scorer: 1992
Gulf Cup of Nations Top Scorer: 1992
Gulf Cup of Nations Best Player: 1992
Arab Golden Ball: 1992
Qatar Stars League Top Scorer: 1993
Arab Golden Boot: 1993
Arab Player of the Year: 1993
Qatar Stars League Most Assists: 1996
Qatar Stars League Top Scorer: 1997
Qatar Stars League Most Assists: 1998
Arab Cup Most Valuable Player: 1998
World Fair Play Trophy by the International Fair Play Committee: 2005
International Olympic Committee Ideal Player Award: 2009

See also 
 List of top international men's football goal scorers by country

References

External links 
 Qatar – List of Top Scorers
 Qatar – List of Champions

1973 births
People from Doha
Living people
Qatari footballers
Qatar international footballers
Footballers at the 1992 Summer Olympics
Olympic footballers of Qatar
1992 AFC Asian Cup players
Al-Arabi SC (Qatar) players
Qatar Stars League players
Al-Khor SC players
Al-Gharafa SC players
Footballers at the 1998 Asian Games
Association football forwards
Asian Games competitors for Qatar
Qatari people of Iranian descent